Egg butter is a mixture of butter and chopped hard boiled eggs. It is a well known spread in Finnish cuisine and Estonian cuisine. 

In Finland, egg butter is typically spread over hot Karelian pasties. In Estonia, egg butter and leib (dark rye bread) are traditionally included in the Easter Sunday meal.

See also
 List of butter dishes
 List of pastries
 List of spreads

References

External links

Finnish cuisine
Estonian cuisine
Egg dishes
Foods featuring butter
Spreads (food)